Ion Ţiriac and Guillermo Vilas were the defending champions, but did not participate this year.

Wojtek Fibak and Tom Okker won the title, defeating Jürgen Fassbender and Jean-Louis Haillet 7–6, 7–5 in the final.

Seeds

  Wojtek Fibak /  Tom Okker (champions)
  Víctor Pecci /  Balázs Taróczy (first round)
  Ross Case /  Jan Kodeš (first round)
  Jürgen Fassbender /  Jean-Louis Haillet (final)

Draw

Draw

External links
 Draw

1979 Grand Prix (tennis)
1979 BMW Open